The 2009 Seguros Bolívar Open Cali was a professional tennis tournament played on outdoor red clay courts. It was the second edition of the tournament which was part of the 2009 ATP Challenger Tour. It took place in Cali, Colombia between 14 and 20 September 2009.

Singles main draw entrants

Seeds

 Rankings are as of August 31, 2009.

Other entrants
The following players received wildcards into the singles main draw:
  Juan Sebastián Cabal
  Alejandro Gómez
  Borut Puc
  Eduardo Struvay

The following players received entry from the qualifying draw:
  Tigre Hank
  Michael Quintero
  Sebastián Serrano
  Nicolás Todero

Champions

Singles

 Alejandro Falla def.  Horacio Zeballos, 6–3, 6–4

Doubles

 Sebastián Prieto /  Horacio Zeballos def.  Ricardo Hocevar /  João Souza, 4–6, 6–3, [10–5]

External links
Official site of Tennis Seguros Bolívar
ITF Search 
2009 Draws

Seguros Bolivar Open Cali
Clay court tennis tournaments
Seguros Bolívar Open Cali
2009 in Colombian tennis